The Women's Javelin throw at the 2011 Asian Athletics Championships was held at the Kobe Universiade Memorial Stadium on 7 July.

Medalists

Records

Schedule

Results

Final
The final was held at 16:45 local time.

References

2011 Asian Athletics Championships
Javelin throw at the Asian Athletics Championships
2011 in women's athletics